Manmord Sidhu, is an Indo-Canadian film producer, director, and distributor who is primarily known for his work in Punjabi films. Manmord Sidhu was 20 when he moved to Vancouver with his family. There he enrolled in Vancouver Film School. Sidhu made his directorial debut with the blockbuster Best of Luck.

His most famous release is Punjab 1984 released in 2014, which won The National Award in 2014.

White Hill Studios
Manmord Sidhu formed production and distribution companies named White Hill Production India Pvt. Ltd., White Hill Music & Entertainment Pvt. Ltd., White Hill Production Inc. (Canada) & White Hill Production Pty Ltd. (Australia).

Filmography
Canadian Dream
Jatt & Juliet 
Jatt & Juliet 2
Best of Luck 2013
Punjab 1984
Romeo Ranjha
Sardaar Ji
Sardaar Ji 2
Saab Bahadar
Channa Mereya
Carry on Jatta 2
Muklawa
DSP Dev
Ardab Mutiyaran
Shareek 2
Lekh
 Jind Mahi

Distribution
Jatt & Juliet
Carry On Jatta
Jatt & Juliet 2
Tu Mera 22 Main Tera 22
Best of Luck
Punjab 1984
Romeo Ranjha
Sadda Haq
Bha Ji in Problem
Drishyam
Shareek
Sardaarji
Airlift
Ghayal Once Again
Love Punjab
Ambarsariya
Udta Punjab
Sardaar Ji 2
Pink
Nikka Zaildar
Rabb Da Radio
Manje Bistre
Begum Jaan
 Muklawa
Kabir Singh
Shadaa

References

1981 births
Living people
Film directors from Chandigarh
Canadian people of Indian descent
Asian-Canadian filmmakers